Newton is a civil parish in Ribble Valley, Lancashire, England.  It contains 28 listed buildings that are recorded in the National Heritage List for England.  Of these, one is at Grade II*, the middle grade, and the others are at Grade II, the lowest grade.  The parish contains the village of Newton-in-Bowland, and is otherwise rural.  The listed buildings are mainly houses with associated structures, farmhouses, and farm buildings, both in the village and in the surrounding countryside.  The other listed buildings include bridges, a public house, a Friends' meeting house, and a former school.

Key

Buildings

Notes and references

Notes

Citations

Sources

Lists of listed buildings in Lancashire
Buildings and structures in Ribble Valley